Hans Göran Magnusson (23 April 1942 – 7 June 2000) was a Swedish chemist.

Magnusson graduated with a Ph.D. in 1975 from Lund University with a thesis on sesquiterpene chemistry, and was simultaneously awarded the title as Docent. In 1978-79, he was a postdoctoral research associate at Rice University, USA, where he worked with natural products' chemist Ernest Wenkert on alkaloid synthesis. After his return to Sweden, he was first recruited to build a research unit in organic chemistry at the Swedish Sugar Corporation before returning to Lund University, where he was appointed Professor of organic chemistry in 1991 and where he stayed until his death.

Sources 
 Magnusson, G. (1991) KC-Kalendern (in Swedish), 22 (4).

References 

1942 births
2000 deaths
Swedish chemists
Lund University alumni
Academic staff of Lund University
Rice University alumni